Haitham Dheeb (born 12 March 1986) is a Palestinian-Israeli footballer who plays as a defender for Hapoel Bu'eine in Liga Bet.

International goals
Scores and results list the Palestine's goal tally first.

Honours

National team
AFC Challenge Cup: 2014

External links

1986 births
Living people
Israeli footballers
Palestinian footballers
Maccabi Ironi Tamra F.C. players
Ihud Bnei Majd al-Krum F.C. players
Hilal Al-Quds Club players
Jabal Al-Mukaber Club players
Shabab Al-Khalil SC players
Ahli Al-Khaleel players
West Bank Premier League players
Association football defenders
Palestine international footballers
2015 AFC Asian Cup players
Palestinian people of Israeli descent